The following is a list of Polish generals, that is the people who held the rank of general, as well as those who acted as de facto generals by commanding a division or brigade.

Note that until the Partitions of Poland of late 18th century the rank of general as such was mostly (though not exclusively) reserved for commanders of artillery, while large tactical units (equivalent of divisions) were usually commanded by hetmans and voivodes.

Polish–Lithuanian Commonwealth

 Mikołaj Abramowicz
 Krzysztof Arciszewski
 Józef Bielak
 Franciszek Ksawery Branicki
 Alojzy Brühl
 August Aleksander Czartoryski
 Ignacy Działyński
 Subchan Ghazi aga
 Wincenty Korwin Gosiewski
 Józef Judycki
 Krzysztof Korycki
 Tadeusz Kościuszko
 Antoni Benedykt Lubomirski
 Jerzy Ignacy Lubomirski
 Marcin Lubomirski
 Michał Lubomirski
 Andrzej Mokronowski
 Fryderyk Józef Moszyński
 Józef Orłowski
 Piotr Ożarowski
 Józef Poniatowski
 Kazimierz Poniatowski
 Stanisław Poniatowski
 Stanisław Kostka Potocki
 Szczęsny Potocki
 Wincenty Potocki
 Zygmunt Przyjemski
 Stanisław Mateusz Rzewuski
 Aleksander Michał Sapieha
 Kazimierz Nestor Sapieha
 Kazimierz Siemienowicz
 Michał Stachurski
 Samuel Świderski
 Jan Tarło
 Michał Wielhorski
 Ludwik Wirtemberg
 Jan de Witte
 Michał Zabiełło
 Szymon Zabiełło

Kościuszko Uprising

Jan August Cichocki
Jan Henryk Dąbrowski
Krystian Godfryd Deybel de Hammerau
Jakub Jasiński
Andrzej Karwowski
Józef Kopeć
Tadeusz Kościuszko
Antoni Madaliński
Stanisław Mokronowski
Józef Orłowski
Józef Poniatowski
Eustachy Sanguszko
Wojciech Strasz
Tomasz Wawrzecki
Michał Wielhorski
Stanisław Wodzicki
Józef Zajączek

Duchy of Warsaw 

 Wincenty Aksamitowski
 Łukasz Biegański
 Józef Chłopicki
 Michał Cichocki
 Jan Henryk Dąbrowski
 Jan Michał Dąbrowski
 Ludwik Mateusz Dembowski
 Dominik Dziewanowski
 Sykstus Estko
 Hipolit Falkowski
 Stanisław Fiszer
 Wilhelm Fiszer
 Ignacy Giełgud
 Józef Grabiński
 Michał Grabowski
 Stefan Grabowski
 Maurycy Hauke
 Kajetan Hebdowski
 Ludwik Kamieniecki
 Michał Ignacy Kamieński
 Krzysztof Karwicki
 Stanisław Klicki
 Karol Kniaziewicz
 Jakub Komierowski
 Jan Konopka
 Antoni Almikar Kosiński
 Józef Kossakowski
 Ksawery Kossecki
 Izydor Krasiński
 Wincenty Krasiński
 Ludwik Kropiński
 Jan Krukowiecki
 Zygmunt Kurnatowski
 Walenty Kwaśniewski
 Józef Łazowski
 Tomasz Łubieński
 Józef Benedykt Łączyński
 Kazimierz Małachowski
 Stanisław Małachowski
 Wojciech Męciński
 Stanisław Mielżyński
 Ernest Jan Karol Mirbach
 Franciszek Morawski
 Karol Morawski
 Józef Niemojewski
 Ksawery Niesiołowski
 Ludwik Michał Pac
 Czesław Pakosz
 Franciszek Paszkowski
 Jean Baptiste Pelletier
 Michał Pełczyński
 Michał Piotrowski
 Józef Poniatowski
 Stanisław Potocki
 Michał Gedeon Radziwiłł
 Józef Rautenstrauch
 Aleksander Rożniecki
 Eustachy Sanguszko
 Julian Sierawski
 Paweł Skórzewski
 Michał Sokolnicki
 Antoni Paweł Sułkowski
 Józef Toliński
 Kazimierz Turno
 Tadeusz Tyszkiewicz
 Jan Nepomucen Umiński
 Józef Wasilewski
 Jan Weyssenhoff
 Józef Wielhorski
 Stanisław Wojczyński
 Jan Henryk Wołodkowicz
 Józef Zajączek
 Edward Żółtowski

November 1830 Uprising 

Józef Bem
Dezydery Chłapowski
Józef Chłopicki
Wojciech Chrzanowski
Henryk Dembiński
Ludwik Kicki
Ignacy Prądzyński
Michał Gedeon Radziwiłł
Maciej Rybiński
Jan Zygmunt Skrzynecki
Józef Longin Sowiński
Karol Turno
Franciszek Żymirski

American Civil War 
Włodzimierz Krzyżanowski

January 1863 Uprising 

Feliks Breański
Stanisław Brzóska
Józef Cieszkowski
Dionizy Czachowski
Jan Chalewski
Onfury Duchiński
Józef Hauke-Bosak
Michał Heidenreich
Artur Gołuchowski
Antoni Jeziorański
Zygmunt Jordan
Ignacy Kruszewski
Stanisław Krzesimowski
Apolinary Kurowski
Marian Langiewicz
Teofil Łapiński
Ludwik Mierosławski
Józef Miniewski
Zygmunt Padlewski
Edmund Różyński
Karol Różyński
Zygmunt Sierakowski
Edmund Taczanowski
Romuald Traugutt
Aleksander Waligórski
Walery Antoni Wróblewski
Józef Wysocki
Władysław Zbyszewski
Władysław Zamoyski
Menotti Garibaldi
Francesco Nullo
François de Rochebrune

Paris Commune

Roman Czarnomski
Jarosław Dąbrowski
August Okołowicz

World War I, Polish-Soviet War and national uprisings of the period

Franciszek Aleksandrowicz
Zachariasz Bakradze
Leon Berbecki
Stefan Dąb-Biernacki
Henryk Karol Korab-Bobkowski
Louis Bonin
Jerzy Dunin-Borkowski
Józef Dunin-Borkowski
Tadeusz Bylewski
Aleksander Czcheidze
Walerian Czuma
Mieczysław Dąbkowski
Bolesław Wieniawa-Długoszowski
Gustaw Orlicz-Dreszer
Karol Durski-Trzaska
Andrzej Galica
Władysław Glass
Roman Górecki
Kazimierz Grudzielski
Józef Haller de Hallenburg
Stanisław Haller de Hallenburg
Eugeniusz de Henning-Michaelis
Kazimierz Horoszkiewicz
Stefan Hubicki
Marian Żegota-Januszajtis
Albin Jasinski
Tadeusz Jastrzębski
Tadeusz Kasprzycki
Roman Gozdawa-Kawecki
Daniel Konarzewski
Tadeusz Kutrzeba
Gustaw Kuchinka
Bolesław Kraupa
Karol Kraus
Aleksander Karnicki
Franciszek Krajowski
Franciszek Latinik
Aleksander Litwinowicz
Kazimierz Ładoś
Gustaw Macewicz
Mikołaj Majewski
Stefan Majewski
Julian Malczewski
Józef Dowbor-Muśnicki
Henryk Minkiewicz
Jan Mischke
Józef Piłsudski
Kazimierz Pławski
Eugeniusz Pogorzelski
Olgierd Pożerski
Władysław Belina-Prażmowski
Stanisław Puchalski
Kazimierz Raszewski
Bolesław Roja
Aleksander Romanowicz
Jan Romer
Eugeniusz Romiszewski
Modest Romiszewski
Stanisław Rouppert
Tadeusz Rozwadowski
Juliusz Rómmel
Wacław Rudoszański-Iwaszkiewicz
Józef Rybak
Edward Śmigły-Rydz
Bolesław Bohusz-Siestrzeńcewicz
Władysław Sikorski
Leonard Skierski
Julian Stachiewicz
Stanisław Szeptycki
Józef Świętorzecki
Michał Karaszewicz-Tokarzewski
Władysław Wejtko
Mieczysław Windakiewicz
Jerzy Wołkowicki
Sergiusz Zahorski
Zygmunt Zieliński
Lucjan Żeligowski

Polish high-ranking officers who served abroad 

Józef Bem
Jan Henryk Dąbrowski
Wiktor Grzesicki
Henryk Wierusz-Kowalski
Adam Nowotny
Maurycy Schmidt
Tadeusz Unrug
Antoni Zdrojewski
Włodzimierz Krzyżanowski

World War II

Roman Abraham
Franciszek Alter
Władysław Anders
Zygmunt Berling
Janusz de Beaurain 
Leon Billewicz
Ludwik Bittner (Halik or Halka)
Karol Bogucki
Bronisław Bohatyrewicz
Mikołaj Bołtuć
Ottokar Brzoza-Brzezina
Władysław Bończa-Uzdowski
Władysław Bortnowski
Mieczysław Boruta-Spiechowicz
Adam Brzechwa-Ajdukiewicz
Stanisław Burghardt-Bukacki
Leopold Cehak
Antoni Chruściel
Jan Chmurowicz
Walerian Czuma
Stefan Dąb-Biernacki
Stanisław Dąbek (posthumously)
Mieczysław Dąbkowski
Franciszek Dindorf-Ankowicz
Juliusz Drapella
Rudolf Dreszer
Konstanty Drucki-Lubecki
Bolesław Bronisław Duch
Kazimierz Dworak
Leopold Engel-Ragis
Adam Epler
Kazimierz Fabrycy
August Emil Fieldorf (Nil)
Julian Filipowicz
Janusz Gąsiorowski
Józef Giza
Kazimierz Glabisz
Janusz Głuchowski
Stanisław Grzmot-Skotnicki 
Eugeniusz de Henning-Michaelis 
Czesław Jarnuszkiewicz
Jan Jur-Gorzechowski
Władysław Jędrzejewski
Władysław Kalkus
Maksymilian Milan-Kamski
Michał Karaszewicz-Tokarzewski
Jan Karcz
Jan Wojciech Kiwerski
Franciszek Kleeberg
Tadeusz Klimecki

Ludwik Kmicic-Skrzyński
Edmund Knoll-Kownacki
Stanisław Kopański
Stefan Kossecki
Wincenty Kowalski
Tadeusz Bór-Komorowski
Alojzy Wir-Konas
Tadeusz Kossakowski
Jan Kruszewski
Marian Kukiel
Józef Kustroń
Tadeusz Kutrzeba
Jan Kazimierz Kruszewski 
Józef Kwaciszewski
Stanisław Kwaśniewski
Władysław Langner
Wilhelm Liszka-Lawicz
Gustaw Łowczowski
Mieczysław Maciejowski
Stanisław Maczek
Juliusz Tarnawa-Malczewski
Stanisław Kostka Miller
Czesław Młot-Fijałkowski
Izydor Modelski
Bernard Mond
Witold Dzierżykraj-Morawski (posthumously)
Stefan Mossor
Aleksander Narbut-Łuczyński
Mieczyslaw Norwid-Neugebauer
Roman Odzierzyński
Leopold Okulicki
Bruno Olbrycht
Józef Olszyna-Wilczynski
Kazimierz Orlik-Łukoski
Wilhelm Orlik-Rückemann
Michał Ostrowski
Ignacy Oziewicz
Gustaw Paszkiewicz
Henryk Krok-Paszkowski
Stefan Pawlikowski (posthumously)
Tadeusz Pełczyński
Zygmunt Piasecki
Konrad Piekarski
Tadeusz Piskor
Konstanty Plisowski
Zygmunt Podhorski
Bolesław Popowicz
Władysław Powierza
Bronisław Prugar-Ketling
Mikołaj Prus-Więckowski
Emil Przedrzymirski-Krukowicz
Wacław Jan Przeździecki
Zdzisław Przyjałkowski
Bronisław Rakowski
Stanisław Rawicz-Dziewulski 
 Ludomił Rayski (air forces)
Stefan Rowecki
Klemens Rudnicki
Juliusz Rómmel
Edward Rydz-Śmigły (Marshal of Poland)
Mieczysław Ryś-Trojanowski
Kazimierz Sawicki
Wacław Scewola-Wieczorkiewicz
Kazimierz Schally
Franciszek Sikorski
Władysław Sikorski
Leonard Skierski
Stanisław Grzmot-Skotnicki
Piotr Skuratowicz
Stanisław Skwarczyński
Felicjan Sławoj-Składkowski
Aleksander Szychowski
Antoni Szymański
Jan Jagmin-Sadowski
Marian Smoleński
Mieczysław Smorawiński
Stanisław Sosabowski
Kazimierz Sosnkowski
Wacław Stachiewicz
Kazimierz Strzemię-Marczyński
Nikodem Sulik
Bolesław Szarecki
Antoni Szylling
Władysław Szyszko-Bohusz
Stanisław Świtalski
Stanisław Taczak
Stanisław Tatar
Wiktor Thommée 
Zygmunt August Tomaszewski
Marian Turowski
Józef Olszyna-Wilczyński 
Józef Werobej
Józef Wiatr
Bolesław Wieniawa-Długoszowski
Kazimierz Wiśniowski
Franciszek Wład
Jerzy Wołkowicki
Józef Ludwik Zając
Mikołaja Zajaczuk
Mariusz Zaruski
Ferdynand Zarzycki
Elżbieta Zawacka
Antoni Zdrojewski
Karol Ziemski
Juliusz Zulauf
Marian Żegota-Januszajtis
Eugeniusz Żongołłowicz

Polish People's Republic

Józef Baryła
Bronisław Jan Bednarz
Zygmunt Berling
Wojciech Bewziuk
Mieczysław Bień
Marian Bondzior
Jerzy Bordziłowski
Edmund Buła
Heliodor Cepa
Jan Czapla
Adam Czaplewski
Bolesław Czarniawski
Zbigniew Czerwiński
Tadeusz Dąbkowski
Mieczysław Dębicki
Jerzy Dymkowski
Tadeusz Dziekan
Rudolf Dzipanov
Stanisław Grodzki
Mieczysław Grudzień
Franciszek Herman
Mirosław Hermaszewski
Władysław Hermaszewski
Tadeusz Hupałowski
Henryk Jabłoński
Wacław Jagas
Michał Jakubik
Wojciech Jaruzelski
Antoni Jasiński
Franciszek Kamiński
Józef Kamiński
Jerzy Kirchmayer
Czesław Kiszczak
Henryk Koczara
Aleksander Kokoszyn 
Władysław Korczyc
Tytus Krawczyc
Stanisław Kruczek
Bronisław Kuriata
Józef Kuropieska
Jerzy Łagoda
Edward Łańcucki
Henryk Michałowski
Norbert Michta 
Eugeniusz Molczyk 
Walenty Nowak
Zbigniew Ohanowicz
Stanisław Okęcki
Stefan Orliński
Roman Paszkowski
Borys Pigarewicz
Czesław Piotrowski
Tadeusz Pióro
Władysław Polański
Fiodor Połynin
Stanisław Popławski
Edward Poradko
Bronisław Półturzycki
Jan Puławski
Otton Roczniok
Aleksander Romeyko
Edwin Rozłubirski
Marian Ryba
Florian Siwicki
Stanisław Skalski
Franciszek Skibiński
Włodzimierz Sokorski
Marian Spychalski
Tadeusz Szaciło
Szczepucha
Karol Świerczewski
Konrad Świetlik 
Stanisław Tatar
Tadeusz Tuczapski
Józef Użycki
Aleksander Waszkiewicz
Czesław Waryszak
Wiktor Ziemiński
Jerzy Ziętek
Michał Żymierski

Contemporary Poland
Janusz Adamczak
Janusz Adamczyk
Andrzej Ameljańczyk
Rajmund Andrzejczak (Current chief of staff of the Polish Armed Forces)
Andrzej Andrzejewski
Stanisław Babiak
Bolesław Balcerowicz
Tadeusz Bałachowicz
Andrzej Baran
Jan Baraniecki
Bolesław Baranowski
Jerzy Baranowski
Jacek Bartoszcze
Roman Baszuk
Tadeusz Bazydło
Tomasz Bąk
Bogusław Bębenek
Jarosław Bielecki
Zbigniew Bielewicz
Mieczysław Bieniek
Czesław Borowski
Aleksander Bortnowski
Zenon Bryk
Józef Buczyński
 bp Mirosław Miron-Chodakowski
Józef Chmiel
Zbigniew Chruściński
Leszek Chyła
Mieczysław Cieniuch (former chief of staff of the Polish Armed Forces)
Witold Cieślewski
Zbigniew Cieślik
Wincenty Cybulski
Fryderyk Czekaj
Stanisław Czepielik
Piotr Czerwiński
Zygmunt Dominikowski
Marek Dukaczewski
Zygmunt Duleba
Andrzej Dulęba
Roman Dysarz
Józef Dziechciarz
Henryk Dziewiątka
Kazimierz Dziok
Andrzej Ekiert
Stanisław Filipiak
Józef Flis
Zbigniew Galec
Franciszek Gągor (former Chief of Staff of the Polish Army)
Jerzy Gil
Kazimierz Głowacki
Zbigniew Głowienka
 bp Sławoj Leszek Głódź
Janusz Godyń
Zdzisław Goral
Jerzy Gotowała
Benedykt Grobelny
Edward Gruszka
Ryszard Gruszka
Brunon Herrmann
 bp Michał Sawa-Hrycuniak
Edward Hyra
Roman Iwaszkiewicz
Bolesław Izydorczyk
Zbigniew Jabłoński
Michał Jackiewicz
Kazimierz Jaklewicz
Janusz Jakubowski
Zygmunt Jasik
Tadeusz Jauer
Tadeusz Jemioło
Józef Jodłowski
Krzysztof Juniec
Mieczysław Kaczmarek
Władysław Karcz
Mieczysław Karus
Jan Kempara
Roman Klecha
Jan Klejszmit
Roman Kloc
Marian Kolczyński
January Komański
Leon Komornicki
Antoni Komorowski
Janusz Konieczny
Lech Konopka
Stanisław Koziej
Michał Krauze
Stanisław Krysiński
Marcin Krzywoszyński
Wojciech Kubiak
Józef Kuczak
Alfons Kupis
Jerzy Kurczewski
Tadeusz Kuziora
Bronisław Kwiatkowski
Ryszard Lackner
Janusz Lalka
Andrzej Lelewski
Andrzej Lewandowski
Zbigniew Lewandowski
Julian Lewiński
Piotr Luśnia
Franciszek Macioła
Kazimierz Madej
Marian Mainda
Gustaw Maj
Julian Maj
Lech Majewski
Piotr Makarewicz
Marek Maruszyński
Włodzimierz Michalski
Ryszard Michałowski
Henryk Mika
Czesław Mikrut
Roman Misztal
Bronisław Młodziejowski
Ryszard Muszyński
Kazimierz Nalaskowski
Paweł Nowak
Stanisław Nowakowicz
Marek Ojrzanowski
Marian Oleksiak
Ryszard Olszewski
Janusz Ornatowski
Krzysztof Owczarek
Bogusław Pacek
Krzysztof Pajewski
Janusz Palus
Jerzy Paszkowski
Edward Pawlica
Bronisław PeikertCzesław Piątas''' (former Chief of Staff of the Polish Army)
Tadeusz Pieciukiewicz
Andrzej Pietrzyk
Edward Pietrzyk

Roman Polko
Aleksander Poniewierka
Franciszek Puchała
Andrzej Ratajczak
Romuald Ratajczak
Adam Rębacz
Marian Robełek
Tadeusz Rusak
Józef Rzemień
Władysław Saczonek
Zygmunt Sadowski
Marek Samarcew
Bogusław Samol
Włodzimierz Sąsiadek
Kazimierz Sikorski
Krzysztof Skarbowski
Henryk Skarżyński
Waldemar Skrzypczak
Zygmunt Skuza
Jerzy Słowiński
Edmund Smakulski
Bogusław Smólski
Zenon Smutniak
Janusz Sobolewski
Marian Sobolewski
Ryszard Sorokosz
Walerian Sowa
Mieczysław Stachowiak
Stanisław Stańko
Lech Stefaniak
Jan Szałaj
Henryk Szumski
Zbigniew Szura
Edward Szwagrzyk
Krzysztof Szymański
Witold Szymański
Andrzej Szymonik
Adam Świerkocz
Henryk Tacik
Stanisław Targosz
Kazimierz Tomaszewski
Aleksander Topczak
Andrzej Trybusz
Piotr Trytek
Andrzej Tyszkiewicz
Leszek Ulandowski
Witold Urbanowicz
Antoni Walczak
Zdzisław Walczewski
Mieczysław Walentynowicz
Jan Waliszkiewicz
Zenon Werner
Zdzisław Wijas
Kazimierz Wilczewski
Tadeusz Wilecki
Grzegorz Wiśniewski
Ryszard Jan Wiśniewski
Alfred Wojciechowski
Wojciech Wojciechowski
Stanisław Woźniak
Dariusz Wroński
Zbigniew Zalewski
Jerzy Zatoński
Włodzimierz Zieliński
Ryszard Żuchowski
Franciszek Żygis
Maciej Żytecki

Some notable Polish officers 
vice-admiral Józef Unrug (commander of the Polish Navy in World War II, Imperial German Navy officer)
 vice-admiral Xawery Czernicki (second commander of the Polish Navy in World War Two, victim of the Katyn massacre)
 admiral Tomasz Mathea (former chief of staff of the Polish Navy)
płk Janusz Bokszczanin  ( partisan, cursed soldier)
płk. Edward Dojan-Surówka (Polish officer, who escaped the division he was commanding in September campaign)
płk. Antoni Szacki (commander of the Holy Cross Mountains Brigade)
płk. Jerzy Leszczynsky-Ziętek 
płk. Tadeusz Wyrwa-Furgalski (Major in the Polish Legions)
ppłk Adam Borys (Pług”, „Adam Gałecki”, „Bryl”, „Kar”, „Dyrektor”, „Pal”) (commander of the Parasol Batalion)
ppłk. Jan Wojciech Kiwerski (Oliwa) (partisan commander in Wołyń, sapper officer)
ppłk. Aleksander Krzyżanowski (Wilk, Jan Kulczycki) (Polish partisan, artillery officer)
ppłk Romuald Bielski (Bej) (member of the Cichociemni, sapper officer, officer in the Warsaw Uprising))
mjr Tadeusz Burdziński (Malina, Zenon, Krzak)
mjr Henryk Dobrzański (Hubal) (first partisan in World War II)
mjr Walerian Łukasiński (officer in the army of Congress Poland)
mjr Henryk Sucharski (commander in e Battle of Westerplatte)
mjr Zygmunt Szendzielarz (cursed soldier, commander of the Home Army 5th Wilno Brigade)
mjr Marian Bernaciak (cursed soldier)
kpt. Władysław Raginis (commander in the Battle of Wizna)
kpt Franciszek Dąbrowski (the second commander in the Battle of Westerplatte)
rtm (kpt) Witold Pilecki (Cursed soldier)
ppor Konrad Guderski (commander of the Defence of the Polish Post Office in Danzig)

See also
 Hetmans of Polish–Lithuanian Commonwealth
 Offices in Polish–Lithuanian Commonwealth

References

External links
 List of active generals on page of Polish Ministry of National Defence

 
Poland
Gen